Dame Elizabeth Jane Campion  (born 30 April 1954) is a New Zealand filmmaker. She is best known for writing and directing the critically acclaimed films The Piano (1993) and The Power of the Dog (2021), for which she has received two Academy Awards (including Best Director for the latter), two BAFTA Awards, and two Golden Globe Awards. Campion was appointed a Dame Companion of the New Zealand Order of Merit (DNZM) in the 2016 New Year Honours, for services to film.

Campion is a groundbreaking female director,  the only woman to be nominated twice for Academy Award for Best Director (winning once), and the first female filmmaker to receive the Palme d'Or (for The Piano, which also won her the Academy Award for Best Original Screenplay). She made history at the 94th Academy Awards when she won Best Director for The Power of the Dog (2021), as the oldest female director to win, the first woman to win Academy Awards for both directing and screenwriting in her different films, and the first woman not to win Best Picture after winning Best Director. She broke the same barrier at the 78th Venice International Film Festival when she won the Silver Lion award. She is the third woman to win the Directors Guild of America Award for Feature Film.  

Campion is also known for directing the films An Angel at My Table (1990), The Portrait of a Lady (1996), Holy Smoke! (1998), and Bright Star (2009). She also co-created the television series Top of the Lake (2013) and received three Primetime Emmy Award nominations.

Early life
Campion was born in Wellington, New Zealand, the second daughter of Edith Campion (née Beverley Georgette Hannah), an actress, writer, and heiress; and Richard M. Campion, a teacher, and theatre and opera director. Her maternal great-grandfather was Robert Hannah, a well-known shoe manufacturer for whom Antrim House was built. Her father came from a family that belonged to the fundamentalist Christian Exclusive Brethren sect. She attended Queen Margaret College and Wellington Girls' College. Along with her sister, Anna, a year and a half her senior, and brother, Michael, seven years her junior, Campion grew up in the world of New Zealand theatre. Their parents founded the New Zealand Players. Campion initially rejected the idea of a career in the dramatic arts and graduated instead with a Bachelor of Arts in Anthropology from Victoria University of Wellington in 1975.

In 1976, she enrolled in the Chelsea Art School in London and traveled throughout Europe. She earned a graduate diploma in visual arts (painting) from the Sydney College of the Arts at the University of Sydney in 1981. Campion's later film work was shaped in part by her art school education; she has, even in her mature career, cited painter Frida Kahlo and sculptor Joseph Beuys as influences.

Campion's dissatisfaction with the limitations of painting led her to filmmaking and the creation of her first short, Tissues, in 1980. In 1981, she began studying at the Australian Film, Television and Radio School, where she made several more short films and graduated in 1984.

Career

Campion's first short film, Peel (1982), won the Short Film Palme d'Or at the 1986 Cannes Film Festival, and other awards followed for the shorts Passionless Moments (1983), A Girl's Own Story (1984), and After Hours (1984). After leaving the Australian Film and Television School, she directed an episode for ABC's light entertainment series Dancing Daze (1986), which led to her first TV film, Two Friends (1986), produced by Jan Chapman.

Her feature debut, Sweetie (1989), won international awards. Further recognition came with An Angel at My Table (1990), a biopic about the life of New Zealand writer Janet Frame, from a screenplay written by Laura Jones. Widespread recognition followed with The Piano (1993), which won the Palme d'Or at the 1993 Cannes Film Festival, Best Director from the Australian Film Institute, and an Academy Award for Best Original Screenplay in 1994. At the 66th Academy Awards, Campion was the second woman ever to be nominated for Best Director for her movie The Piano.

Campion's 1996 film The Portrait of a Lady, based on the Henry James novel, featured Nicole Kidman, John Malkovich, Barbara Hershey and Martin Donovan. Holy Smoke! (1999) saw Campion teamed with Harvey Keitel for a second time (the first being The Piano), this time with Kate Winslet as the female lead. In the Cut (2003), an erotic thriller based on Susanna Moore's bestseller, provided Meg Ryan an opportunity to depart from her more familiar onscreen persona. Her 2009 film Bright Star, a biographical drama about poet John Keats (played by Ben Whishaw) and his lover Fanny Brawne (Abbie Cornish), was shown at the Cannes Film Festival. In an interview with Jan Lisa Huttner, Campion discussed how she focused on Fanny's side of the story, pointing out that only two of the film's scenes did not feature her.

Campion created, wrote, and directed the TV mini-series Top of the Lake, which received near universal acclaim, won numerous awards—including, for its lead actress Elisabeth Moss, a Golden Globe Award for Best Actress – Miniseries or Television Film and a Critics' Choice Television Award for Best Actress in a Movie/Miniseries—and was nominated for the Primetime Emmy Award for Outstanding Lead Actress in a Miniseries or a Movie. Campion was also nominated for the Primetime Emmy Award for Outstanding Directing for a Miniseries, Movie or a Dramatic Special.

She was the head of the jury for the Cinéfondation and Short Film sections at the 2013 Cannes Film Festival and the head of the jury for the main competition section of the 2014 Cannes Film Festival. When Canadian filmmaker Xavier Dolan received the Prix du Jury for his film Mommy, he said that Campion's The Piano "made me want to write roles for women—beautiful women with soul, will and strength, not victims or objects." Campion responded by rising from her seat to give him a hug.

In 2014, it was announced that Campion was nearing a deal to direct an adaptation of Rachel Kushner's novel The Flamethrowers.

In 2015, Campion confirmed that she would co-direct and co-write a second season of Top of the Lake with the story moved to Sydney and Harbour City, Hong Kong, and with Elisabeth Moss reprising her role as Robin Griffin. The sequel series titled Top of the Lake: China Girl was released in 2017. Shot and set in Sydney, Top of the Lake: China Girl features Alice Englert, Campion's daughter, in a lead role as Robin's biological daughter. The series also features Ewen Leslie, David Dencik and Nicole Kidman.

In 2019, Campion's first film in a decade was announced, an adaptation of Thomas Savage's novel The Power of the Dog. The film was written and directed by her and was released in 2021, having premiered at the 78th Venice International Film Festival, where Campion was awarded the Silver Lion for Best Direction. The film was critically acclaimed internationally, winning numerous awards and nominations for the direction, screenplay, and performance of the cast of actors. Campion earned three nominations in the respective categories for Best Director, Best Screenplay and Best Picture at the Golden Globe Awards, AACTA International Awards, Critics' Choice Movie Awards, and Satellite Awards. Campion issued an apology to Serena and Venus Williams following criticism of her acceptance speech for Critics Choice Movie Award for Best Director, in which Campion said, "And you know, Serena and Venus, you are such marvels. However, you do not play against the guys — like I have to." Her apology included, "I made a thoughtless comment equating what I do in the film world with all that Serena Williams and Venus Williams have achieved,” she said. "I did not intend to devalue these two legendary Black women and world-class athletes." In February 2022, the film received 12 nominations at the 94th Academy Awards, leading that year's Oscar nominations. The film was nominated for Best Picture, Best Director, Best Adapted Screenplay, Best Actor for Benedict Cumberbatch, Best Supporting Actress for Kirsten Dunst, and Best Supporting Actor for both Kodi Smit-McPhee and Jesse Plemons. Campion became the first woman to receive multiple Best Director nominations, and she won Best Director for the film. She is also the first woman to win Best Director without also winning a corresponding Best Picture.

Personal life
In 1992, Campion married Colin David Englert, an Australian who worked as a second unit director on The Piano. Their first child, Jasper, was born in 1993 but lived for only 12 days. Their second child, Alice Englert, was born in 1994; she is an actress. The couple divorced in 2001.

Reception
Her work, according to the critic bell hooks, "seduces and excites audiences with its uncritical portrayal of sexism and misogyny. Reviewers and audiences alike seem to assume that Campion's gender, as well as her breaking of traditional boundaries that inhibit the advancement of women in film, indicate that her work expresses a feminist standpoint." Accordingly, Campion's work has received praise from other critics. In V.W. Wexman's Jane Campion: Interviews (1999), critic David Thomson describes Campion "as one of the best young directors in the world today." In Sue Gillett's "More Than Meets The Eye: The Mediation of Affects in Jane Campion's Sweetie", Campion's work is described as "perhaps the fullest and truest way of being faithful to the reality of experience"; by utilizing the "unsayable" and "unseeable", she manages to catalyze audience speculation. Campion's films tend to gravitate around themes of gender politics, such as seduction and female sexual power. This has led some to label Campion's body of work as feminist; however, Rebecca Flint Marx argues that "while not inaccurate, [the feminist label] fails to fully capture the dilemmas of her characters and the depth of her work."

Honours and accolades

Campion was appointed a Dame Companion of the New Zealand Order of Merit (DNZM) in the 2016 New Year Honours, for services to film.

Filmography

Feature films

Short films

Television

Recurring collaborators

See also 

 Women's cinema
 New Zealand film makers

References

Bibliography 
 Cheshire, Ellen: Jane Campion. London: Pocket Essentials, 2000.
 Fox, Alistair: Jane Campion: Authorship and Personal Cinema. Bloomington–Indianapolis: Indiana University Press, 2011. .
 Gillett, Sue: 'Views for Beyond the Mirror: The Films of Jane Campion.' St.Kilda: ATOM, 2004. 
 Hester, Elizabeth J.: Jane Campion: A Selective Annotated Bibliography of Dissertations and Theses. , .
 Jones, Gail: 'The Piano.' Australian Screen Classics, Currency Press, 2007.
 Margolis, Harriet (ed): 'Jane Campion's The Piano.' Cambridge University Press, 2000.
 McHugh, Kathleen: 'Jane Campion.'Urbana and Chicago: University of Illinois Press, 2007.
 Radner, Hilary, Alistair Fox and Irène Bessière (eds): 'Jane Campion: Cinema, Nation, Identity.'Detroit: Wayne State University Press,2009.
 Verhoeven, Deb: Jane Campion. London: Routledge, 2009.
 Wexman V.W.: Jane Campion: Interviews. Roundhouse Publishing. 1999.

External links

 
 
 Jane Campion Bibliography, Berkeley.edu 
 Senses of Cinema: Great Directors Critical Database
 
 

1954 births
Living people
Alumni of Chelsea College of Arts
Australian Film Television and Radio School alumni
Best Directing Academy Award winners
Best Director BAFTA Award winners
Best Director Golden Globe winners
Best Original Screenplay Academy Award winners
César Award winners
Dames Companion of the New Zealand Order of Merit
Directors of Palme d'Or winners
English-language film directors
Golden Globe Award-winning producers
New Zealand emigrants to Australia
New Zealand film directors
New Zealand film producers
New Zealand screenwriters
New Zealand women film directors
New Zealand women film producers
New Zealand women screenwriters
People educated at Wellington Girls' College
People from Wellington City
Venice Best Director Silver Lion winners
Victoria University of Wellington alumni
Women television writers
Writers Guild of America Award winners